Hermann Gräf (born February 8, 1964), better known as Herman Gref, is a Russian politician and businessman. He was the Minister of Economics and Trade of Russia from May 2000 to September 2007. He is the CEO and chairman of the executive board of Sberbank, the largest Russian bank.

Education and early career
Herman Gref was born in the Kazakh Soviet Socialist Republic (now Kazakhstan) into a family of German deportees who were exiled there in 1941. Later Gref was involved in the return of exiled Germans to Russia - with his assistance an entire German village called Strelna was built near St. Petersburg.

There are two versions of what Gref did after graduation. According to one of them, Gref entered the faculty of international economic relations at MGIMO of the Ministry of Foreign Affairs of the USSR, but after the first year he was expelled from the university. According to the other version, after school Gref and his first wife, Elena Velikanova, entered Omsk State University, but failed the exams.

In 1981-1982, he worked as a legal advisor for the Irtysh District Department of the Pavlodar Region.

From 1982 to 1984, Gref served in the army.

After fulfilling two years of military service, he studied law at Omsk State University in Siberia from 1985 to 1990.

After that he enrolled in the post-graduate program at the Law Department of St. Petersburg State University. He graduated in 1993 under the guidance of Anatoly Sobchak. However, he did not defend his dissertation until 2011.  From 1992 to 1998 Gref worked on several positions at the Saint Petersburg City Administration, notably a term as vice-governor from 1997 to 1998.  He became a friend and ally of Vladimir Putin during this period; he also made acquaintance with Alexei Kudrin, Dmitry Kozak, and Dmitry Medvedev.

Work for the Russian government

In August 1998, Gref was appointed First Deputy Minister of State Property of the Russian Federation, and was a member of its board until 2000.  He was also appointed to the board of the Federal Commission for the Securities Market of the Russian Federation and the board of state-owned Svyazinvest and Gazprom in 1999.

Gref was first appointed as Minister of the newly formed Ministry of Economic Development and Trade on May 18, 2000 and was reappointed to the position in the succeeding Cabinet in 2004.

Gref was a major advocate of Russia's joining the World Trade Organization. He is also responsible for creation of the Stabilisation Fund.

Gref was considered as one of the liberal reformers in Vladimir Putin's administration of the early and mid-2000s, besides Alexei Kudrin. Gref has repeatedly spoken out against the monopolization of the oil and gas sector of the economy. 

Gref resigned as minister in 2007 along with Mikhail Fradkov's government.

At various times he was a member of the board of directors of such state-owned companies as Gazprom, Aeroflot, Rosneft, Svyazinvest, etc.

In January 2018, Gref was added to the US Treasury's "Kremlin list", a list of 210 officials, politicians and businessmen believed to be close to Vladimir Putin. According to the US Department of Treasury, the list is not a sanctions list and no restrictions are automatically imposed on its subjects. He was later subjected to full U.S. Treasury sanctions following the 2022 Russian invasion of Ukraine.

In January 2022, Gref, Elvira Nabiullina, and other economic advisors delivered to President Putin a report on Western sanctions as well as the effect on the Russian economy if sanctions escalated due to the Russian military buildup on Ukraine's borders.  Gref is said to have warned of serious economic impacts, but if he was attempting to dissuade Putin from proceeding with further escalation, this failed after the 2022 Russian invasion of Ukraine began a month later.  In April 2022, Gref was added to the European Union sanctions list "in response to the ongoing unjustified and unprovoked Russian military aggression against Ukraine and other actions undermining or threatening the territorial integrity, sovereignty and independence of Ukraine".

Work as CEO of Sberbank
In November 2007 Gref was elected as president of the state-owned savings bank Sberbank at an extraordinary general meeting. Under Gref's leadership, the bank has undergone a number of radical changes aimed at improving its efficiency and corporate culture.

In 2010, speaking at the Davos Economic Forum, Gref spoke in favor of reducing the state's stake in the capital of Russian banks; in particular, he proposed reducing the state stake in Sberbank from 57.6 percent to 50 percent plus one share. In March of the following year, the sale of a 7.58 percent stake in Sberbank was approved by the National Banking Council, and in September 2012 the shares were sold on the stock exchange for $5.22 billion.

In 2019 the shareholders of Sberbank re-elected Herman Gref for a fourth term. He will be president and chairman of the bank until 2023.

Gref is member of boards and supervisory boards of a number of companies. Until October 2020 he had been a member of board of directors of Yandex.

In February 2019, Gref called upon Russians "to prepare for the very worst of situations" after the U.S. adopted new sanctions against Russia.

Personal life
Gref married the designer Yana  on May 1, 2004 in the throne room of Peterhof Palace. His wife has a teenage son from a prior relationship, just as Gref has a son, Oleg, from his marriage with Yelena, who refused to move to Moscow when Gref was called into the government in 1998. Since 2006 the couple has a daughter. Oleg studied jurisprudence in St. Petersburg until 2004 and moved to Germany for further education. Gref speaks German and is an admirer of Goethe and German Expressionism.

After the Russian annexation of Crimea and a raised risk of being sanctioned, Gref used the Singapore firm Asiaciti Trust to restructure a $75 million family trust through a network of offshore companies in 2015. He gave more than $50 million held in the trust to a 24-year old nephew who lived outside of Russia, but remained in control of the assets through the offshore companies.

In a November 2016 interview with Russian News Agency TASS, Gref admitted to speculating with Bitcoin.

See also
Timeline of Russian interference in the 2016 United States elections

References

External links 

 Brief official bio at sberbank.com

Gref, German Oskarovich
Gref, German Oskarovich
1st class Active State Councillors of the Russian Federation
Gref, German Oskarovich
Gref, German Oskarovich
Russian bankers
Economy ministers of Russia
Kazakhstani people of German descent
Russian people of German descent
Gazprom people
Omsk State University alumni
Russian individuals subject to the U.S. Department of the Treasury sanctions
Russian individuals subject to European Union sanctions